The Bykivnia graves are a National Historic Memorial next to the former village of Bykivnia within Kyiv woodland, Bykivnia Forest. During the Stalinist period in the Soviet Union, it was one of the unmarked mass grave sites where the NKVD, the Soviet secret police, disposed of thousands of executed "enemies of the Soviet state".

Bykivnia as a residential place still exists as an locality with the same Bykivnia Forest. The National Memorial is located across Brovarskyi prospect from Bykivnia, next to the former Rybne Soviet fishery in the thick of the woods.

The number of dead bodies buried there is estimated between "dozens of thousand," to 30,000, to 100,000. Some estimates place the number as high as 200,000.

Burial site
From the early 1920s until the late 1940s throughout the Stalinist purges, the Soviet government hauled the bodies of tortured and killed political prisoners to the pine forests outside the village of Bykivnia and buried them in a grave that spanned . So far, 210 separate mass graves have been identified by Polish and Ukrainian archaeologists working at the site. During the Soviet retreat in the early stages of Operation Barbarossa, Red Army troops levelled the village to the ground.

The mass grave site was discovered by the Germans along with many other such sites throughout the Soviet Union. However, following the discovery of the Katyn massacre, the burial sites of Bykivnya was no longer part of German propaganda. After the Soviet recapture of the area during the Second Battle of Kyiv in 1943, the site was again classified by the NKVD. In the 1950s the village was reconstructed as a suburb of Kyiv. In the 1970s the Soviet authorities planned to construct a large bus station on the mass grave site, but the plan was abandoned.

A document attesting to the origins of the Bykovnia victims was found by Polish émigré historians, research in the Nazi German archives after the war. Polish researchers estimate that, apart from the Soviet victims of the Great Terror, the site might be the final resting place of 3,435 Polish officers captured by the Red Army during the Soviet invasion of Poland, together with Nazi Germany in 1939, most of whom were executed in the spring of 1940 with over 20,000 Polish officers and intellectuals in the Katyn massacre.

As the Soviet authorities denied responsibility, there was no way to confirm that the victims of the Stalinist purges were buried there. During the Soviet era the existence of the site was brought up to authorities numerous times with the most famous incident occurring in 1962 when the Ukrainian poet Vasyl Symonenko did so. He was badly beaten up by Soviet law enforcement agents and died in the hospital from kidney failure soon after.

Commemoration
It was not until the 1990s that the authorities of independent Ukraine confirmed the burial of thousands of victims there. On April 30, 1994, a large memorial to the victims of communism was opened in Bykivnia. Around the same time archaeological works started, with both Ukrainian and Polish scientists taking part. In 2001 the government of Viktor Yanukovych proclaimed the will to convert the Bykivnia woods into a State Historical–Memorial Complex "Graves of Bykivnia". The plan was brought to life by Viktor Yushchenko on May 17, 2006.

In a step toward uncovering this part of Ukraine's history, Viktor Yushchenko became the first Ukrainian president to take part in the annual Day of Remembrance ceremony on May 21 to honor the estimated 100,000 people buried in the mass grave on the outskirts of Kyiv. "We must know the truth. Why did our nation lose more than 10 million people without a war?" Yushchenko said during the 2006 event.

Since 2006, Polish researchers have found a number of bodies of Poles, prisoners killed in spring 1940 during the Katyn massacre. Apart from bodies, Polish researchers found everyday items, such as a comb, on which the owner, an unknown Polish officer, carved several names, such as Franciszek Strzelecki, Ludwik Dworak and Szczyrad. This might refer to Colonel Bronisław Mikołaj Szczyradłowski, the deputy commandant of Lwów's defense in September 1939.

A dog tag belonging to a Sergeant Józef Naglik, soldier of the Skalat Battalion of the Border Defence Corps, was found at the same spot. All the names belong to the "Ukrainian Katyn List" of Katyn massacre victims, and serve as proof that Bykivnya is connected to the Katyn crime.

See also 
 Dem'ianiv Laz, a mass grave site near Ivano-Frankivsk
 Great Purge
 Katyń Massacre
 Kurapaty, a similar mass grave site near Minsk, Belarus
 Svirlag
 Vinnytsia massacre
 Vasyl Symonenko
 Mass graves in the Soviet Union

Notes and references

External links

 Twentieth Century Atlas – Casualty Statistics  Bykivnia
 
 Bykivnia 1937–1941
 Ukraine reburies Stalin's victims
 
 . New Tang Dynasty Television, May 23, 2008

Geography of Kyiv Oblast
Mass graves in Ukraine
Massacres in Ukraine
Massacres in the Soviet Union
Massacres committed by the Soviet Union
NKVD
Political repression in the Soviet Union
Prisoner of war massacres
Soviet World War II crimes
Historic sites in Ukraine
Landmarks in Kyiv
Protected areas of Ukraine
Protected areas established in 2001
Monuments and memorials in Kyiv
Cemeteries in Ukraine
Tourist attractions in Kyiv Oblast
Execution sites